Bad Sobernheim station is a through station, 38.44 km from Bingen on the Nahe Valley Railway  (Bingen–Saarbrücken), in the town of Bad Sobernheim in the district of Bad Kreuznach in the German state of Rhineland-Palatinate.  It is classified by Deutsche Bahn as a category 5 station.

Infrastructure

The heritage-listed entrance building was built in the early years of the Nahe Valley Railway during the second half of the 19th century. It consists of a two-story main building, built of sandstone ashlar, with eight portals on the long sides, and flanked by single-storey wings with three portals. The three buildings are topped by slated hip roofs.

From 2006 to 2007, the station was rebuilt and now has two 160 metre-long platforms on three platform tracks, lifts and an underpass. In 2012 the park-and-ride area was expanded. A “bike-and-ride” facility is located at the station to serve riders on the Nahe cycleway (Nahe-Radweg).

Rail services

From Monday to Sunday there is an hourly service by Regional-Express and Regionalbahn services. Every two hours, the Regional-Express service continued directly to/from Frankfurt Airport and Frankfurt Hauptbahnhof.

The station is served by buses coordinated by the Rhein-Nahe Nahverkehrsverbund (Rhine-Nahe Transport Association, RNN). In the local transport plan of the Bad Kreuznach district, it is planned to expand operations at the station as a network node.

Notes

External links

 

Railway stations in Rhineland-Palatinate
Buildings and structures in Bad Kreuznach (district)